La Salut is a neighborhood in the Gràcia district of Barcelona, Catalonia, Spain.

References

Salut, la
Salut, la